SS Dwinsk was a British-flagged ocean liner sunk by  in World War I. The ship was previously the third Rotterdam for the Holland America Line, C.F. Tietgen for the Scandinavian America Line, and, as Dwinsk, for the Russian American Line. The ship was put under Cunard Line management in 1917, and sailed under the British flag until sunk on 18 June 1918.

History
SS Rotterdam was launched 18 February 1897 by Harland & Wolff in Belfast for the Holland America Line, the third ship by that name for the line. She sailed from Rotterdam, her namesake city, to Boulogne and New York on her maiden voyage 18 August 1897. The ship began its final voyage on this route on 17 February 1906.

Purchased by the Scandinavian America Line on 5 April 1906, the ship was renamed C. F. Tietgen after Carl Frederik Tietgen, a Danish merchant. The ship operated primarily on a Copenhagen-Kristiania-Kristiansand-New York route through 1913.

In July 1913 the ship was chartered to Nordisk Film A/S for the filming of the movie Atlantis. Later in 1913, the ship was sold to the Russian American Line and renamed Dwinsk, and operating between Libau and New York from 10 February 1914. On 20 September 1914, Dwinsk began service on an Archangel-Hammerfest-New York route.

In 1917, control of the ship passed to Cunard Line who reflagged her under the British flag, and retaining her existing name. After the ship sank, U-151 remained in the area, using the survivors in seven lifeboats as a lure to try to sink additional Allied ships.

Later the same day,  spotted wreckage and the seven lifeboats, and as it approached the survivors, narrowly averted a torpedo strike launched by U-151.

Six of the lifeboats were rescued by other ships; the seventh lifeboat, in the charge of the Second Officer, Joseph William Coppin (born 1881, St Neot, Cornwall), with 22 men aboard was never heard from again.  rescued two boats on 21 June, and  picked up the final boat on 28 June.

References

External links
 
 

Ships built in Belfast
Ocean liners
Ships sunk by German submarines in World War I
World War I shipwrecks in the Atlantic Ocean
1897 ships
Maritime incidents in 1906
Maritime incidents in 1918
Ships built by Harland and Wolff